The Carmelite Convent was established in Lviv by Jakub Sobieski. Many particulars of its design (decorative vases, Andreas Schwaner's statues) were patterned after the Roman church of Santa Susanna. Its construction, commenced in 1642, was greatly delayed by the events of the Deluge. The Carmelites departed from the nunnery in 1792. It was later used as a metrology office. The Ukrainian Greek Catholic Church recently reconsecrated the church to Christian worship and dedicated it to the Presentation of Our Lord.

References 
 Вуйцик В. С., Липка Р. М. Зустріч зі Львовом. Львів: Каменяр, 1987. С. 65.
 Островский Г. С. Львов. Издание второе, переработанное и дополненное. Ленинград: Искусство, 1975. С.107-108.

Carmelite churches in Ukraine
Roman Catholic monasteries in Ukraine
Churches in Lviv